René Oliveira is an attorney and former Democratic member of the Texas House of Representatives. He was first elected to represent the 37th District in 1981. After losing a 1986 bid for the Texas State Senate, he was out of office from 1987 until he regained his seat in the Texas House in the 1990 election.

Oliveira was defeated for reelection in the May 2018 primary runoff election by Alex Dominguez.

Texas House of Representatives
Oliveira served on the Business & Industry Committee, which he chaired; the State Affairs Committee; and the Redistricting Committee. He is a former chairman of the House Ways and Means Committee.

References

External links
Legislative page
 René Oliveira at the Texas Tribune

|-

Living people
People from Brownsville, Texas
University of Texas alumni
University of Texas School of Law alumni
Texas lawyers
Democratic Party members of the Texas House of Representatives
21st-century American politicians
Year of birth missing (living people)